The Blue Grey River is a river in New Zealand. It is an upper tributary of the Grey River, flowing from Lake Christabel, close to the township of Maruia Springs, and flowing west for  before reaching the upper Grey River.

See also
List of rivers of New Zealand

References

Rivers of the West Coast, New Zealand
Rivers of New Zealand